The Ngoulmendjim Power Station is a planned hydroelectric power station across the Komo River in Gabon. The power station is under development, by a consortium comprising the French conglomerate Eranove Group and Gabonese Fund for Strategic Investments (FGIS). As of November 2021, the development was in the "financial mobilization phase".

Location

Overview
Libreville, the capital city of Gabon, is home to approximately half of the country's population. As of 2018, 15-20 megawatts of new annual generation capacity, were required to keep up with new demand in Libreville alone. Ngoulmendjim HPP, is intended to address this need.

Three Pelton turbines will be installed and are expected to generate 82 megawatts of electricity. A 30-year power purchase agreement has been executed between the Government of Gabon and the power station developers.

Ownership
The developers of this power station, have formed a special purpose vehicle company called Asokh Energy, that will own, design, develop, operate and maintain this HPP. The table below, illustrates the shareholding in Asokh Energy.

Note: Gabon Power Company (GPC) is a subsidiary of Gabonese Fund for Strategic Investments (FGIS).

Construction costs
The construction budget is reported as €300 million. The developer/owners have selected the African Development Bank as the lead arranger of a syndicated loan. The British financial house Standard Chartered Bank was selected to structure the loan.

See also
 List of power stations in Gabon
 Dibwangui Hydroelectric Power Station

References

External links

Hydroelectric power stations in Gabon
Estuaire Province
Proposed power stations
Dams in Gabon